This is a list of locomotives and multiple unit classes of the DSB, the primary train operator in Denmark. Steam locomotive classes were usually designated by a single capital letter, whereas diesel locomotives and DMUs are named with two (occasionally, three) letters, the first being an M for "motor"; electric locomotives and EMUs are given two-letter combinations, the first being an E. The classes are referred to as "litra" (from Latin littera, "letter") in Danish, e.g. "litra MY" for the class MY locomotives. In addition to this class designation, each locomotive or multiple unit within a class has its own number.

The list is sorted chronologically by date of first delivery of a locomotive or multiple unit of the particular class. For classes no longer in regular service at DSB, the year of last retirement is listed. Some classes have been sold to Railion after DSB Gods was merged with it in 2001; in that case, year of retirement is put in parentheses. For each class, the wheel arrangement is given in UIC notation.

Steam locomotives

Diesel locomotives

Electric locomotives

DMUs

EMUs

S-trains

External links
 Jernbanen.dk (in Danish)
 DSB's page about trains currently in service (in Danish)
 Overview of Danish rail vehicles (in German)
 Steam locomotives at DSB (in Danish)

References

 Page with information about the fabled "Marilyn Monroe" locomotives, Litra MY 1201 and MY 1202 (in English)

Rolling stock of Denmark